A Kink in the Picasso is a 1990 Australian film directed by Marc Gracie and written by Hugh Stuckey. It was filmed in Melbourne from October to November 1989.

References

External links
 

1990 television films
1990 films
Australian television films
1990s English-language films